The 1939 Pittsburgh Pirates season was the 58th season of the Pittsburgh Pirates franchise; the 53rd in the National League. The Pirates finished sixth in the league standings with a record of 68–85.

Offseason 
 December 16, 1938: Johnny Dickshot, Al Todd and cash were traded by the Pirates to the Boston Bees for Ray Mueller.

Regular season

Season standings

Record vs. opponents

Game log

|- bgcolor="ccffcc"
| 1 || April 17 || @ Reds || 7–5 || Blanton (1–0) || Walters || Brown (1) || 30,644 || 1–0
|- bgcolor="ffbbbb"
| 2 || April 18 || Cardinals || 2–3 || Weiland || Klinger (0–1) || Shoun || 15,783 || 1–1
|- bgcolor="ffbbbb"
| 3 || April 22 || @ Reds || 2–4 || Derringer || Blanton (1–1) || — || — || 1–2
|- bgcolor="ffbbbb"
| 4 || April 23 || @ Reds || 2–7 || Walters || Klinger (0–2) || — || 23,339 || 1–3
|- bgcolor="ffbbbb"
| 5 || April 24 || @ Cubs || 2–6 || Whitehill || Tobin (0–1) || Russell || 15,844 || 1–4
|- bgcolor="ffbbbb"
| 6 || April 25 || @ Cubs || 3–5 || Lee || Sewell (0–1) || — || 9,913 || 1–5
|- bgcolor="ffbbbb"
| 7 || April 26 || @ Cubs || 1–3 || Lillard || Blanton (1–2) || — || 9,516 || 1–6
|- bgcolor="ffbbbb"
| 8 || April 27 || @ Cardinals || 5–6 (11) || McGee || Brown (0–1) || — || 1,994 || 1–7
|- bgcolor="ffbbbb"
| 9 || April 29 || Reds || 3–5 || Walters || Tobin (0–2) || — || 5,913 || 1–8
|-

|- bgcolor="ccffcc"
| 10 || May 1 || Reds || 2–1 || Sewell (1–1) || Moore || — || 2,724 || 2–8
|- bgcolor="ccffcc"
| 11 || May 2 || @ Dodgers || 3–2 || Klinger (1–2) || Fitzsimmons || — || 9,269 || 3–8
|- bgcolor="ccffcc"
| 12 || May 4 || @ Phillies || 6–4 || Bauers (1–0) || Butcher || — || 3,500 || 4–8
|- bgcolor="ccffcc"
| 13 || May 5 || @ Phillies || 10–7 || Sewell (2–1) || Hollingsworth || Brown (2) || 2,000 || 5–8
|- bgcolor="ffbbbb"
| 14 || May 6 || @ Phillies || 0–1 || Passeau || Brown (0–2) || — || 7,000 || 5–9
|- bgcolor="ccffcc"
| 15 || May 7 || @ Bees || 9–2 || Klinger (2–2) || Posedel || — || 21,336 || 6–9
|- bgcolor="ccffcc"
| 16 || May 8 || @ Bees || 3–2 || Tobin (1–2) || Frankhouse || — || 2,303 || 7–9
|- bgcolor="ccffcc"
| 17 || May 10 || @ Giants || 5–0 || Sewell (3–1) || Gumbert || — || 6,030 || 8–9
|- bgcolor="ffbbbb"
| 18 || May 11 || @ Giants || 1–4 || Melton || Bowman (0–1) || — || 4,041 || 8–10
|- bgcolor="ffbbbb"
| 19 || May 13 || Cubs || 2–6 || Lee || Klinger (2–3) || — || 6,948 || 8–11
|- bgcolor="ccffcc"
| 20 || May 14 || Cubs || 5–2 || Tobin (2–2) || Lillard || — || 15,397 || 9–11
|- bgcolor="ffbbbb"
| 21 || May 15 || Cubs || 2–6 || French || Sewell (3–2) || — || 3,941 || 9–12
|- bgcolor="ccffcc"
| 22 || May 16 || Phillies || 8–5 || Bowman (1–1) || Passeau || — || 1,823 || 10–12
|- bgcolor="ffbbbb"
| 23 || May 17 || Phillies || 3–7 || Mulcahy || Klinger (2–4) || — || 2,075 || 10–13
|- bgcolor="ccffcc"
| 24 || May 18 || Phillies || 5–4 (10) || Tobin (3–2) || Hollingsworth || — || 2,183 || 11–13
|- bgcolor="ffbbbb"
| 25 || May 19 || Bees || 2–5 || Errickson || Sewell (3–3) || — || 2,672 || 11–14
|- bgcolor="ccffcc"
| 26 || May 20 || Bees || 12–6 || Bowman (2–1) || Earley || Brown (3) || 4,643 || 12–14
|- bgcolor="ccffcc"
| 27 || May 21 || Giants || 4–1 || Klinger (3–4) || Hubbell || — || 20,976 || 13–14
|- bgcolor="ffbbbb"
| 28 || May 22 || Giants || 2–9 || Schumacher || Tobin (3–3) || — || 2,886 || 13–15
|- bgcolor="ccffcc"
| 29 || May 23 || Giants || 13–4 || Sewell (4–3) || Melton || — || 3,823 || 14–15
|- bgcolor="ccffcc"
| 30 || May 24 || Dodgers || 6–3 || Bowman (3–1) || Tamulis || — || 2,490 || 15–15
|- bgcolor="ffbbbb"
| 31 || May 25 || Dodgers || 2–8 || Pressnell || Klinger (3–5) || — || 5,600 || 15–16
|- bgcolor="ccffcc"
| 32 || May 26 || @ Cubs || 14–5 || Tobin (4–3) || Lee || Brown (4) || 5,982 || 16–16
|- bgcolor="ccffcc"
| 33 || May 27 || @ Cubs || 9–1 || Sewell (5–3) || Higbe || — || 8,035 || 17–16
|- bgcolor="ffbbbb"
| 34 || May 28 || @ Cubs || 2–6 || Dean || Bowman (3–2) || — || 26,511 || 17–17
|- bgcolor="ccffcc"
| 35 || May 29 || @ Cardinals || 7–0 || Klinger (4–5) || Weiland || — || 1,736 || 18–17
|- bgcolor="ffbbbb"
| 36 || May 30 || @ Cardinals || 2–7 || Warneke || Tobin (4–4) || — || — || 18–18
|- bgcolor="ccffcc"
| 37 || May 30 || @ Cardinals || 14–8 || Swift (1–0) || Davis || — || 14,178 || 19–18
|-

|- bgcolor="ccffcc"
| 38 || June 1 || @ Phillies || 5–2 || Sewell (6–3) || Higbe || — || — || 20–18
|- bgcolor="ccffcc"
| 39 || June 3 || @ Phillies || 10–7 || Brown (1–2) || Hollingsworth || Swift (1) || 2,000 || 21–18
|- bgcolor="ccffcc"
| 40 || June 4 || @ Dodgers || 7–3 || Tobin (5–4) || Hamlin || — || — || 22–18
|- bgcolor="ffbbbb"
| 41 || June 4 || @ Dodgers || 1–14 || Casey || Klinger (4–6) || — || 24,257 || 22–19
|- bgcolor="ffbbbb"
| 42 || June 5 || @ Dodgers || 2–6 || Tamulis || Sewell (6–4) || — || 6,680 || 22–20
|- bgcolor="ffbbbb"
| 43 || June 6 || @ Dodgers || 2–5 || Fitzsimmons || Bowman (3–3) || — || 6,907 || 22–21
|- bgcolor="ccffcc"
| 44 || June 7 || @ Bees || 2–0 || Swift (2–0) || MacFayden || — || 2,795 || 23–21
|- bgcolor="ffbbbb"
| 45 || June 8 || @ Bees || 0–2 || Fette || Tobin (5–5) || — || 1,894 || 23–22
|- bgcolor="ffbbbb"
| 46 || June 9 || @ Bees || 1–4 || Posedel || Klinger (4–7) || — || 2,062 || 23–23
|- bgcolor="ffbbbb"
| 47 || June 10 || @ Giants || 2–6 || Schumacher || Sewell (6–5) || — || 6,815 || 23–24
|- bgcolor="ffbbbb"
| 48 || June 11 || @ Giants || 3–7 || Gumbert || Bowman (3–4) || — || — || 23–25
|- bgcolor="ffbbbb"
| 49 || June 11 || @ Giants || 4–5 || Melton || Klinger (4–8) || Coffman || 34,749 || 23–26
|- bgcolor="ffbbbb"
| 50 || June 15 || Bees || 5–6 (11) || Lanning || Tobin (5–6) || — || 2,900 || 23–27
|- bgcolor="ccffcc"
| 51 || June 16 || Bees || 4–2 || Klinger (5–8) || Posedel || Brown (5) || 2,491 || 24–27
|- bgcolor="ffbbbb"
| 52 || June 17 || Phillies || 2–11 || Johnson || Sewell (6–6) || — || 3,741 || 24–28
|- bgcolor="ffbbbb"
| 53 || June 21 || Giants || 4–6 || Melton || Tobin (5–7) || Hubbell || 5,194 || 24–29
|- bgcolor="ccffcc"
| 54 || June 22 || Giants || 8–7 || Bowman (4–4) || Coffman || — || 3,869 || 25–29
|- bgcolor="ccffcc"
| 55 || June 23 || Dodgers || 2–1 || Bauers (2–0) || Hamlin || — || 2,419 || 26–29
|- bgcolor="ccffcc"
| 56 || June 24 || Dodgers || 6–2 || Tobin (6–7) || Pressnell || — || 5,582 || 27–29
|- bgcolor="ffbbbb"
| 57 || June 25 || Dodgers || 5–6 || Hamlin || Klinger (5–9) || Fitzsimmons || 14,543 || 27–30
|- bgcolor="ffbbbb"
| 58 || June 27 || @ Reds || 0–6 || Derringer || Bauers (2–1) || — || 5,181 || 27–31
|-

|- bgcolor="ccffcc"
| 59 || July 1 || @ Cardinals || 4–3 || Brown (2–2) || Davis || — || 2,336 || 28–31
|- bgcolor="ccffcc"
| 60 || July 2 || @ Cardinals || 8–5 || Klinger (6–9) || Weiland || Bauers (1) || — || 29–31
|- bgcolor="ccffcc"
| 61 || July 2 || @ Cardinals || 6–3 || Tobin (7–7) || Warneke || — || 10,449 || 30–31
|- bgcolor="ffbbbb"
| 62 || July 4 || Reds || 4–7 || Grissom || Swift (2–1) || — || — || 30–32
|- bgcolor="ccffcc"
| 63 || July 4 || Reds || 4–3 || Brown (3–2) || Vander Meer || — || 41,937 || 31–32
|- bgcolor="ccffcc"
| 64 || July 5 || Cubs || 10–1 || Bowman (5–4) || Root || — || 2,201 || 32–32
|- bgcolor="ccffcc"
| 65 || July 6 || Cubs || 7–2 || Klinger (7–9) || Dean || — || 6,257 || 33–32
|- bgcolor="ffbbbb"
| 66 || July 7 || Cubs || 4–5 (11) || Lee || Bauers (2–2) || — || 4,438 || 33–33
|- bgcolor="ffbbbb"
| 67 || July 9 || Cardinals || 3–7 || Cooper || Brown (3–3) || — || — || 33–34
|- bgcolor="ccffcc"
| 68 || July 9 || Cardinals || 8–6 || Tobin (8–7) || Weiland || — || 29,000 || 34–34
|- bgcolor="ccffcc"
| 69 || July 12 || @ Dodgers || 3–0 || Brown (4–3) || Wyatt || — || 29,481 || 35–34
|- bgcolor="ffbbbb"
| 70 || July 14 || @ Dodgers || 4–14 || Hamlin || Bowman (5–5) || — || 20,735 || 35–35
|- bgcolor="ffbbbb"
| 71 || July 15 || @ Dodgers || 2–6 || Fitzsimmons || Tobin (8–8) || — || 6,814 || 35–36
|- bgcolor="ffbbbb"
| 72 || July 16 || @ Phillies || 2–3 || Mulcahy || Brown (4–4) || — || — || 35–37
|- bgcolor="ccffcc"
| 73 || July 16 || @ Phillies || 7–3 || Klinger (8–9) || Butcher || Swift (2) || 12,958 || 36–37
|- bgcolor="ccffcc"
| 74 || July 17 || @ Phillies || 7–4 || Bowman (6–5) || Harrell || — || 2,500 || 37–37
|- bgcolor="ffbbbb"
| 75 || July 18 || @ Phillies || 3–8 || Johnson || Swift (2–2) || — || 6,000 || 37–38
|- bgcolor="ccffcc"
| 76 || July 19 || @ Giants || 10–3 || Brown (5–4) || Lohrman || — || 3,331 || 38–38
|- bgcolor="ccffcc"
| 77 || July 20 || @ Giants || 8–4 || Klinger (9–9) || Gumbert || Bowman (1) || 4,310 || 39–38
|- bgcolor="ccffcc"
| 78 || July 21 || @ Giants || 4–3 || Sewell (7–6) || Melton || Swift (3) || 5,355 || 40–38
|- bgcolor="ccffcc"
| 79 || July 22 || @ Bees || 9–3 || Swift (3–2) || MacFayden || — || 2,583 || 41–38
|- bgcolor="ccffcc"
| 80 || July 23 || @ Bees || 3–2 || Brown (6–4) || Shoffner || Sewell (1) || — || 42–38
|- bgcolor="ffbbbb"
| 81 || July 23 || @ Bees || 0–1 || Fette || Klinger (9–10) || — || 15,558 || 42–39
|- bgcolor="ccffcc"
| 82 || July 25 || Phillies || 5–4 (10) || Klinger (10–10) || Pearson || — || 2,539 || 43–39
|- bgcolor="ccffcc"
| 83 || July 26 || Phillies || 3–1 || Swift (4–2) || Higbe || Brown (6) || — || 44–39
|- bgcolor="ccffcc"
| 84 || July 26 || Phillies || 5–3 || Bowman (7–5) || Beck || — || 10,611 || 45–39
|- bgcolor="ffbbbb"
| 85 || July 27 || Phillies || 8–9 || Harrell || Sewell (7–7) || Higbe || 2,610 || 45–40
|- bgcolor="ffbbbb"
| 86 || July 28 || Bees || 1–7 || Turner || Brown (6–5) || — || 3,137 || 45–41
|- bgcolor="ccffcc"
| 87 || July 29 || Bees || 6–5 || Bowman (8–5) || Shoffner || Brown (7) || 4,962 || 46–41
|- bgcolor="ffbbbb"
| 88 || July 30 || Bees || 5–7 || Posedel || Swift (4–3) || Sullivan || 27,099 || 46–42
|-

|- bgcolor="ffbbbb"
| 89 || August 1 || Dodgers || 3–5 || Fitzsimmons || Brown (6–6) || Tamulis || 3,392 || 46–43
|- bgcolor="ccffcc"
| 90 || August 2 || Dodgers || 6–0 || Bowman (9–5) || Hamlin || — || 3,240 || 47–43
|- bgcolor="ffbbbb"
| 91 || August 3 || Dodgers || 1–4 || Pressnell || Butcher (0–1) || — || 3,112 || 47–44
|- bgcolor="ccffcc"
| 92 || August 4 || Giants || 3–2 (11) || Sewell (8–7) || Melton || — || 3,477 || 48–44
|- bgcolor="ffbbbb"
| 93 || August 5 || Giants || 3–4 || Hubbell || Brown (6–7) || — || 8,932 || 48–45
|- bgcolor="ffbbbb"
| 94 || August 6 || Giants || 5–9 || Schumacher || Bowman (9–6) || Melton || — || 48–46
|- bgcolor="ccffcc"
| 95 || August 6 || Giants || 6–0 (8) || Klinger (11–10) || Salvo || — || 37,665 || 49–46
|- bgcolor="ffbbbb"
| 96 || August 9 || @ Cardinals || 3–5 || Sunkel || Bauers (2–3) || Shoun || 3,334 || 49–47
|- bgcolor="ffbbbb"
| 97 || August 11 || @ Cubs || 2–3 || Lee || Sewell (8–8) || — || 7,296 || 49–48
|- bgcolor="ffbbbb"
| 98 || August 12 || @ Cubs || 4–6 || Bryant || Swift (4–4) || Passeau || 9,223 || 49–49
|- bgcolor="ffbbbb"
| 99 || August 13 || @ Cubs || 4–5 || Dean || Klinger (11–11) || — || 25,180 || 49–50
|- bgcolor="ffbbbb"
| 100 || August 14 || @ Reds || 8–9 || Thompson || Brown (6–8) || — || 23,044 || 49–51
|- bgcolor="ffbbbb"
| 101 || August 15 || @ Reds || 5–6 || Niggeling || Bowman (9–7) || — || 7,941 || 49–52
|- bgcolor="ffbbbb"
| 102 || August 16 || Cardinals || 3–4 || Bowman || Klinger (11–12) || Shoun || — || 49–53
|- bgcolor="ffbbbb"
| 103 || August 16 || Cardinals || 0–3 || McGee || Butcher (0–2) || — || 7,855 || 49–54
|- bgcolor="ffbbbb"
| 104 || August 17 || Cardinals || 2–4 || Davis || Brown (6–9) || — || 2,737 || 49–55
|- bgcolor="ffbbbb"
| 105 || August 18 || Cardinals || 0–3 || Bowman || Bauers (2–4) || — || 2,586 || 49–56
|- bgcolor="ffbbbb"
| 106 || August 19 || Cubs || 0–5 || Lee || Tobin (8–9) || — || 3,126 || 49–57
|- bgcolor="ffbbbb"
| 107 || August 20 || Cubs || 5–9 || Passeau || Klinger (11–13) || — || — || 49–58
|- bgcolor="ccffcc"
| 108 || August 20 || Cubs || 5–0 (6) || Butcher (1–2) || Whitehill || — || 13,076 || 50–58
|- bgcolor="ccffcc"
| 109 || August 22 || @ Bees || 8–2 || Bowman (10–7) || Fette || Swift (4) || 1,767 || 51–58
|- bgcolor="ffbbbb"
| 110 || August 23 || @ Bees || 0–1 || Posedel || Brown (6–10) || — || 4,691 || 51–59
|- bgcolor="ffbbbb"
| 111 || August 23 || @ Bees || 1–3 || MacFayden || Heintzelman (0–1) || — || 4,691 || 51–60
|- bgcolor="ccffcc"
| 112 || August 24 || @ Giants || 4–3 || Butcher (2–2) || Salvo || — || 4,341 || 52–60
|- bgcolor="ffbbbb"
| 113 || August 26 || @ Giants || 2–6 || Schumacher || Klinger (11–14) || Brown || — || 52–61
|- bgcolor="ffbbbb"
| 114 || August 26 || @ Giants || 0–8 || Melton || Bowman (10–8) || — || 10,756 || 52–62
|- bgcolor="ffbbbb"
| 115 || August 27 || @ Dodgers || 2–3 || Fitzsimmons || Brown (6–11) || Tamulis || — || 52–63
|- bgcolor="ccffcc"
| 116 || August 27 || @ Dodgers || 9–5 || Blanton (2–2) || Hollingsworth || — || 20,119 || 53–63
|- bgcolor="ccffcc"
| 117 || August 31 || @ Phillies || 1–0 || Butcher (3–2) || Higbe || — || — || 54–63
|- bgcolor="ffbbbb"
| 118 || August 31 || @ Phillies || 6–11 || Beck || Klinger (11–15) || — || 8,000 || 54–64
|-

|- bgcolor="ccffcc"
| 119 || September 2 || @ Cardinals || 11–3 || Brown (7–11) || Bowman || — || 2,636 || 55–64
|- bgcolor="ffbbbb"
| 120 || September 3 || @ Cardinals || 6–14 || Davis || Bowman (10–9) || Shoun || — || 55–65
|- bgcolor="ffbbbb"
| 121 || September 3 || @ Cardinals || 0–3 || Weiland || Blanton (2–3) || — || 11,066 || 55–66
|- bgcolor="ccffcc"
| 122 || September 4 || @ Cubs || 2–1 || Butcher (4–2) || Dean || — || — || 56–66
|- bgcolor="ccffcc"
| 123 || September 4 || @ Cubs || 6–3 || Klinger (12–15) || Page || — || 32,974 || 57–66
|- bgcolor="ccffcc"
| 124 || September 6 || Reds || 5–4 (11) || Swift (5–4) || Johnson || — || — || 58–66
|- bgcolor="ffbbbb"
| 125 || September 6 || Reds || 3–4 (10) || Derringer || Bowman (10–10) || — || 7,548 || 58–67
|- bgcolor="ccffcc"
| 126 || September 7 || Reds || 8–7 (11) || Sewell (9–8) || Johnson || — || 2,484 || 59–67
|- bgcolor="ffbbbb"
| 127 || September 8 || Reds || 2–5 || Walters || Butcher (4–3) || — || 4,479 || 59–68
|- bgcolor="ffbbbb"
| 128 || September 9 || Cardinals || 2–12 || Weiland || Brown (7–12) || — || 3,817 || 59–69
|- bgcolor="ffbbbb"
| 129 || September 10 || Cardinals || 3–9 || Davis || Klinger (12–16) || — || — || 59–70
|- bgcolor="ffbbbb"
| 130 || September 10 || Cardinals || 4–11 || Bowman || Bowman (10–11) || — || 12,588 || 59–71
|- bgcolor="ccffcc"
| 131 || September 11 || Cardinals || 8–6 || Tobin (9–9) || Andrews || — || 1,134 || 60–71
|- bgcolor="ffbbbb"
| 132 || September 13 || Giants || 0–2 || Gumbert || Swift (5–5) || — || — || 60–72
|- bgcolor="ccffcc"
| 133 || September 13 || Giants || 7–4 || Klinger (13–16) || Melton || Sewell (2) || 3,426 || 61–72
|- bgcolor="ccffcc"
| 134 || September 14 || Dodgers || 4–3 || Brown (8–12) || Tamulis || — || — || 62–72
|- bgcolor="ffbbbb"
| 135 || September 14 || Dodgers || 4–8 || Crouch || Swigart (0–1) || — || 3,637 || 62–73
|- bgcolor="ffbbbb"
| 136 || September 15 || Dodgers || 2–4 (10) || Hutchinson || Butcher (4–4) || — || 1,548 || 62–74
|- bgcolor="ffbbbb"
| 137 || September 16 || Dodgers || 2–3 || Fitzsimmons || Bowman (10–12) || Tamulis || 2,457 || 62–75
|- bgcolor="ffbbbb"
| 138 || September 17 || Phillies || 3–7 || Johnson || Gee (0–1) || — || — || 62–76
|- bgcolor="ccffcc"
| 139 || September 17 || Phillies || 10–1 || Klinger (14–16) || Pearson || — || 8,008 || 63–76
|- bgcolor="ccffcc"
| 140 || September 18 || Phillies || 7–4 || Brown (9–12) || Bruner || — || 688 || 64–76
|- bgcolor="ccffcc"
| 141 || September 19 || Bees || 5–3 || Sewell (10–8) || Turner || — || 702 || 65–76
|- bgcolor="ccffcc"
| 142 || September 21 || Bees || 6–4 || Gee (1–1) || Veigel || — || 1,980 || 66–76
|- bgcolor="ccffcc"
| 143 || September 21 || Bees || 7–0 || Swigart (1–1) || Posedel || — || 1,980 || 67–76
|- bgcolor="ffbbbb"
| 144 || September 22 || @ Reds || 0–6 || Thompson || Brown (9–13) || — || — || 67–77
|- bgcolor="ffbbbb"
| 145 || September 22 || @ Reds || 9–10 || Shoffner || Klinger (14–17) || — || 5,841 || 67–78
|- bgcolor="ffbbbb"
| 146 || September 23 || @ Reds || 5–6 || Walters || Swift (5–6) || — || — || 67–79
|- bgcolor="ffbbbb"
| 147 || September 23 || @ Reds || 1–6 || Grissom || Bowman (10–13) || — || 20,951 || 67–80
|- bgcolor="ffbbbb"
| 148 || September 24 || @ Reds || 2–11 || Derringer || Gee (1–2) || — || 19,929 || 67–81
|- bgcolor="ffbbbb"
| 149 || September 27 || Cubs || 8–9 (10) || French || Sewell (10–9) || — || — || 67–82
|- bgcolor="ffbbbb"
| 150 || September 27 || Cubs || 5–9 (10) || Russell || Swift (5–7) || Whitehill || 1,483 || 67–83
|- bgcolor="ffbbbb"
| 151 || September 29 || Reds || 1–2 || Grissom || Bowman (10–14) || — || 1,477 || 67–84
|-

|- bgcolor="ffbbbb"
| 152 || October 1 || Reds || 1–9 || Thompson || Clemensen (0–1) || — || — || 67–85
|- bgcolor="ccffcc"
| 153 || October 1 || Reds || 8–0 || Heintzelman (1–1) || Moore || — || 3,859 || 68–85
|-

|-
| Legend:       = Win       = LossBold = Pirates team member

Opening Day lineup

Roster

Player stats

Batting

Starters by position 
Note: Pos = Position; G = Games played; AB = At bats; H = Hits; Avg. = Batting average; HR = Home runs; RBI = Runs batted in

Other batters 
Note: G = Games played; AB = At bats; H = Hits; Avg. = Batting average; HR = Home runs; RBI = Runs batted in

Pitching

Starting pitchers 
Note: G = Games pitched; IP = Innings pitched; W = Wins; L = Losses; ERA = Earned run average; SO = Strikeouts

Other pitchers 
Note: G = Games pitched; IP = Innings pitched; W = Wins; L = Losses; ERA = Earned run average; SO = Strikeouts

Relief pitchers 
Note: G = Games pitched; W = Wins; L = Losses; SV = Saves; ERA = Earned run average; SO = Strikeouts

Farm system

LEAGUE CHAMPIONS: Carthage

Notes

References 
 1939 Pittsburgh Pirates team page at Baseball Reference
 1939 Pittsburgh Pirates Page at Baseball Almanac

Pittsburgh Pirates seasons
Pittsburgh Pirates season
Pittsburg Pir